Softimage|3D was a high-end 3D graphics application developed by Softimage, Co., which was used predominantly in the film, broadcasting, gaming, and advertising industries for the production of 3D animation. It was superseded by Softimage XSI in 2000.

History
In 1986, National Film Board of Canada filmmaker Daniel Langlois, in partnership with software engineers Richard Mercille and Laurent Lauzon, began developing an integrated 3D modeling, animation, and rendering package with a graphical interface targeted at visual artists. The software was initially demonstrated at SIGGRAPH in 1988 and was released for Silicon Graphics workstations the following year as the Softimage Creative Environment™.

Softimage Creative Environment was adopted by major visual effects studios like Industrial Light & Magic and Digital Domain for use in their production pipelines, which also typically included software from Alias Research, Big Idea Productions, Kroyer Films, Angel Studios, Walt Disney Feature Animation Inc., and Pixar Animation Studios Inc. as well as a variety of custom tools. Its character animation toolset expanded substantially with the addition of inverse kinematics in version 2, which was used to animate the dinosaurs in Jurassic Park. In 1994, Microsoft acquired Softimage, Co. with the intention of introducing high-end 3D animation software to its Windows NT platform, and subsequently renamed it "Softimage|3D." In January 1995, Softimage|3D was announced as the official 3D development tool for the Sega Saturn.

The first Windows port of Softimage|3D, version 3.0, was released in early 1996. Softimage|3D Extreme 3.5, released later that year, included particle effects and the mental ray renderer, which offered area lights, ray tracing, and other advanced features. 3D paint functionality was added a year later in version 3.7.

In the late 1990s, Softimage Co. began developing a successor to Softimage|3D codenamed "Sumatra," which was designed with a more modern and extensible architecture to compete with other major packages like Alias|Wavefront's Maya. Development was delayed during a 1998 acquisition by Avid Technology, and in the summer of 2000 Softimage|3D's successor was finally released as Softimage XSI. Because of Softimage|3D's entrenched user base, minor revisions continued until the final version of Softimage|3D, version 4.0, was released in 2002.

Release history

Features
The Softimage|3D feature set was divided between five menu sets: Model, Motion, Actor, Matter and Tools, each corresponding to a different part of the 3D production process:

Model: Tools for creating spline, polygon, patch, and NURBS primitives (later releases also included Metaballs). Boolean operations, extrusions, revolves, and bevels, as well as lattice deformations and relational modeling tools. Subdivision surface modeling was available via a third-party plugin from Phoenix Tools called MetaMesh.

Motion: Animation of objects and parameters via keyframes, constraints, mathematical expressions, paths, and function curves. Animatable cluster and lattice deformations. Motion capture through a variety of input devices.

Actor: Rigging and animation of digital characters using skeletons, as well as dynamics tools for physics simulations of object interactions. Included inverse kinematics and weighted / rigid skinning.

Matter: Creation of materials and rendering images for output. Standard features included 2D and 3D textures, field rendering, fog, motion blur, and raytracing.

Tools: Utilities for viewing, editing, and compositing rendered image sequences, color reduction, and importing/exporting images and 3D geometry.

References

External links
 .
 .
 .
 .
 .
 .
 .
 .
 .

3D graphics software
Animation software
IRIX software
1988 software